Dhariwal is a surname. It also may refer to:

 Dhariwal (clan)
 Dhariwal, India
 Dhariwal, Pakistan